Padbury is a suburb of Perth, Western Australia, located within the City of Joondalup. Its postcode is 6025. The suburb was named in 1971 after the notable Western Australian settler Walter Padbury. (A street in Padbury is also named after Walter Padbury, Walter Padbury Boulevard.) Several locations in the north section of Padbury bordering Whitfords Avenue take on the name Whitfords. The south east corner of the suburb also goes by the name of Hepburn Heights, and the most eastern part of Padbury is often called Pinnaroo Heights. Padburys population in 2021 was 8,626.

Education 
Padbury contained one high school, Padbury Senior High School, which closed in 2011, and four primary schools: Padbury Primary School, Bambara Primary School, South Padbury Primary School and Padbury Catholic Primary School.

References

Suburbs of Perth, Western Australia
Suburbs in the City of Joondalup